As if or As If may refer to:

Music
As If, the former, short-lived name of alternative rock band Our Lady Peace

Albums and EPs
As If (album), !!!'s sixth studio album
As If! (EP), a 2011 EP by Sky Ferreira

Songs
"As If" (song), a 2007 song by Sara Evans
"As If", a song by R&B trio Blaque from the Bring It On soundtrack
"As If", a song by rapper Prodigy from Hegelian Dialectic

Television
 As If (British TV series), a British television series
 As If (American TV series), an American television series based upon the British series of the same name
 , a Turkish television series

Other uses
The Philosophy of 'As if', a 1911 work by German philosopher Hans Vaihinger
Ås IF, Swedish football club
"As if", a phrase and exemplar of Valleyspeak
As-if rule, a rule governing translation of computer programs

See also